Sergio Luchetti (born 13 April 1958) is an Argentine fencer. He competed in the individual and team foil and épée events at the 1984 Summer Olympics.

References

External links
 

1958 births
Living people
Argentine male fencers
Argentine épée fencers
Argentine foil fencers
Olympic fencers of Argentina
Fencers at the 1984 Summer Olympics